Henry I, Count of Nassau-Beilstein (1307-1388) was a son of Henry I of Nassau-Siegen and his wife, Adelaide of Heinsberg-Blankenberg.  His parents had initially destined him for an ecclesiastical career.  However, he later married Meyna of Westerburg and after his father's death became the first count of Nassau-Beilstein.

Henry and Meyna had three children:
 Henry II, his successor
 Reinhard (d. 1412)
 Adelaide, married Hartmuth of Cronberg.

Counts of Nassau
1307 births
1388 deaths
14th-century German nobility